Lyrurus is a genus of birds in the grouse subfamily. They are known as black grouse because the male's plumage of both species is colored black as its base colour.

Taxonomy 
The genus Lyrurus was introduced in 1832 by the English naturalist William John Swainson with the black grouse as the type species. The genus name combines the Ancient Greek lura meaning "lyre" with -ouros meaning "-tailed".

Species
The genus contains two species:

References

 
Bird genera